Milvydai (formerly) is a village in Kėdainiai district municipality, in Kaunas County, in central Lithuania. According to the 2011 census, the village had a population of 6 people.

There was an okolica of Milvydai (a property of the Ivaškevičiai) at the beginning of the 20th century.

Demography

References

Villages in Kaunas County
Kėdainiai District Municipality